Lan Yang is a Chinese-born physicist specializing in optics.

Lan Yang earned her bachelor's and first master's of science degrees at the University of Science and Technology of China in 1997 and 1999, respectively. She completed a second master's degree in materials science at the California Institute of Technology in 2000, and remained at Caltech to pursue a doctorate in applied physics, which she obtained in 2005. Lan Yang began teaching at the Washington University in St. Louis in 2007, as an assistant professor. She became an associate professor in 2012, then a full professor in 2014, as Edwin H. & Florence G. Skinner Professor in Electrical and Systems Engineering. From January 2019, Lan Yang served as editor in chief of the journal Photonics Research.

Lan Yang received a National Science Foundation CAREER Award in 2010, followed by a Presidential Early Career Award for Scientists and Engineers the next year. She was elected a fellow of the Optical Society in 2017, "for seminal contribution in nanophotonics and photonic sensing." In 2020, the American Physical Society awarded her an equivalent honor, "for seminal contributions to non-Hermitian photonics, optical sensing, and nanophotonics."

References

Living people
Year of birth missing (living people)
Chinese women physicists
Chinese expatriates in the United States
Fellows of the American Physical Society
Fellows of Optica (society)
Optical physicists
University of Science and Technology of China alumni
California Institute of Technology alumni
Washington University in St. Louis faculty
21st-century Chinese physicists
Academic journal editors
Washington University physicists